Holy Trinity Church is an Anglican church in Gisborne Road, in the town of Bacchus Marsh, Victoria.  The church was established in 1851.

History

Pre 1849 - Bacchus Marsh was probably served by itinerant preachers from around 1847.

1849 - first Baptism performed in January by first clergy Rev. William Hall
1851 - prefabricated iron church erected. Amongst the first parishes in Victoria, the land was donated by William Bacchus, son of Captain W H Bacchus after whom Bacchus Marsh is named.
1861 - Iron church building consecrated
1857 - School established on site of current hall
1868 - Andrew Scott (later to become bushranger "Captain Moonlite") attended as lay reader.
1876 - Foundation Stone Laid
1877 - Current Sandstone (& limestone) church opened
1881 - Current church consecrated, pulpit installed
1953 - Church gates built and consecrated
1955 - Hall built as a war memorial
1971 - Memorial garden completed

References

External links

 Anglican Church Of Australia Holy Trinity Bacchus Marsh

Churches in Victoria (Australia)
Bacchus Marsh
1851 establishments in Australia
Churches completed in 1851